Khi Solar One (KSO) is a solar power tower solar thermal power plant, located in the Northern Cape Region of South Africa. Khi Solar One is 50 megawatts (MW), and is the first solar tower plant in Africa.

Abengoa claim it is the first thermal solar tower plant in Africa and the first tower plant to achieve 24 hours of operation with solar energy only, but that thanks to the decline in power demand at night, since full power storage lasts only 2 hours.

The KSO is an evolution of the PS10 and PS20 projects, operating since 2007 and 2009 respectively in Spain. KSO uses a superheated steam cycle that should be able to reach a maximum operating temperature of 530 °C. Accumulated saturated steam is also used to provide up to two hours of thermal storage at the plant. KSO condenser is cooled with a dry cooling system, a natural draft condenser that uses towers to distribute air across fin blades in order to dissipate heat.

The project has been developed by the Spanish company Abengoa, and the project was financed with help from Industrial Development Corporation (IDC) and community group, Khi Community Trust.

Accident 

In November 2014, a crane collapse on site during construction killed two and injured seven. The accident was largely responsible for the project commencing commercial operation fourteen months later than scheduled.

Gallery

Abengoa Bankruptcy 

In November 2015, Abengoa started insolvency proceedings.  Khi Solar One is one of the assets which Abengoa could be looking to sell.

On 27 December 2016, Abengoa received a “Provisional Acceptance Certificate”, officially handing the plant to its owner Khi Solar One Pty Ltd. Abengoa has a 51% stake, Industrial Development Corporation (IDC) has a 29% stake and Khi Community Trust has a 20% stake in that society. Abengoa will take on the operation and maintenance of the plant. The plant output is sold to grid operator Eskom under a 20-year PPA (Power Purchase Agreement).

Khi Solar One demonstrated in early 2016, up to 24 consecutive hours of operation.

See also

List of power stations in South Africa
List of solar thermal power stations
Solar thermal energy

References

Solar thermal energy
Solar power stations in South Africa
Economy of the Northern Cape
Dawid Kruiper Local Municipality